Ivar Samuel "Iffa-Sven" Svensson (sometimes spelled Iwar Swensson; 7 November 1893 – 18 June 1934) was a Swedish football (soccer) player who competed in the 1912 Summer Olympics. He played as forward one match in the main tournament as well as one match in the consolation tournament. He scored two goals in the main tournament.

References

External links

 Swedish squad in 1912 

1893 births
1934 deaths
Swedish footballers
Sweden international footballers
IFK Norrköping players
Olympic footballers of Sweden
Footballers at the 1912 Summer Olympics
Association football forwards
Sportspeople from Norrköping
Footballers from Östergötland County